Duo is an album by fiddle and mandolin player Peter Ostroushko with guitarist Dean Magraw, released in 1991.

Track listing 
All songs by Peter Ostroushko unless otherwise noted.
"The Whalebone Feathers" – 4:33
"Musette in a Minor" – 3:36
"Three Brazilian Melodies: Index One/Index Two/Index Three" – 8:21
"The Nightingale Medley: Index One/Index Two" – 5:38
"Unknowingly She Walked With Grace Amongst Tall Men" – 9:14
"The Prairie Suite" – 8:55
"Waltz for Hana" – 4:19
"Bukavina" – 3:35
"When You and I Were Young, Maggie" (James Austin Butterfield, George Washington Johnson) – 5:26
"Fiddle Tunes: Mesa de Esoeranza/The Edinburgh Jigs/Sarah Breaky's House, The London Road Jig, Clive Palmer's, The Easter Road)" – 8:44

Personnel
Peter Ostroushko – mandolin, fiddle, guitar, vocals
Dean Magraw – guitar

Production notes
Produced and mixed by Peter Ostroushko
Bob Feldman – executive producer
Tom Mudge – engineer, mixing
Craig Thorson – assistant engineer
Linda Beauvais – artwork, design
Dan Corrigan – photography

References

1991 albums
Peter Ostroushko albums
Red House Records albums